Makoto Satō (佐藤 真 Satō Makoto, September 12, 1957 - September 4, 2007) was a Japanese documentary film director. Among his best-known films were Living On the River Agano, which describes people around the Agano River where incidents of Niigata Minamata disease were discovered, and Self and Others.

His final film, Out of Place: Memories of Edward Said (2005), was named Best Documentary at the 2006 Mainichi Film Awards.

Early life 
Satō was born in Hirosaki, Aomori Prefecture, and raised in Tokyo.

Filmography 
 Living on the River Agano (1992, 阿賀に生きる)
 Artists in Wonderland (1998, まひるのほし)
 Self and Others (2000, SELF AND OTHERS)
 Hanako (2001, 花子)
 Memories of Agano (2004, 阿賀の記憶)
 Out of Place: Memories of Edward Said (2005, エドワード・サイード OUT OF PLACE)

References

External links
 An English-language interview with Sato
 Box set of the Complete Works of Makoto Sato
 Towards a Cinema of Absence - Satō Makoto in the Japanese and international context

1957 births
2007 deaths
Japanese documentary film directors
Japanese documentary filmmakers
Japanese film directors